Hellbender is a simulation video game developed by Terminal Reality and published by Microsoft Studios for Windows 95. It is the sequel to Fury3. A demo version of the game was included on later CD-ROM versions of Windows 95. The voice of the ship's computer is portrayed by Gillian Anderson.

Gameplay
The player is in control of a prototype spacecraft (the "Hellbender") and must fly it around a map, destroying various targets and reaching checkpoints. The Hellbender has no inertia and thus cannot crash. There are ten weapons available. The Valkyrie and Laser cannons have unlimited ammo, but there are also dumbfire Sledgehammer rockets, homing Viper missiles, and devastating Doomsday mines. Many more weapons are available by collecting power-ups during gameplay.

The levels in Hellbender are composed of a few missions that take place on eight different planets. There are typically three missions per planet.

Plot
Six years after the events depicted in Fury3, the Bions (an alien race created by Terran scientists which rebelled and became ruthless killing machines) kill all the Coalition's qualified pilots on Sebek. The player's character ("the Councilor") is the last surviving pilot for the Coalition of Independent Planets, the defense group that protects the universe from the Bions. The Bions are now targeting the rest of the Coalition's citizens. The pilot must accomplish various objectives on eight different worlds in order to stop the Bions, save the universe, and win the game.

Development 
The game was published by Microsoft Game Studios. Microsoft had spent millions to create their own game division.

Reception
Entertainment Weekly gave the game a B- and compared the game to Wing Commander III, but said that Microsoft seemed to be better at making word processing programs than games.

References

External links

1996 video games
Microsoft games
Science fiction video games
Simulation video games
Video game sequels
Video games developed in the United States
Video games set in the 29th century
Windows games
Windows-only games
Terminal Reality games
Multiplayer and single-player video games